Musica Elettronica Viva (MEV) is a live acoustic/electronic improvisational group formed in Rome, Italy, in 1966. It is "something of an irregular institution, a band that has come together intermittently through the years". Its founding members have been reported variously as Allan Bryant, Alvin Curran, Jon Phetteplace, and Frederic Rzewski; Rzewski, Curran, and Richard Teitelbaum; Curran, Phetteplace, Bryant, and Carol Plantamura; and Rzewski, Teitelbaum, Plantamura, Bryant, Phetteplace, Ivan Vandor, and Steve Lacy. Garrett List and George E. Lewis subsequently joined the group.

MEV were early experimenters with the use of synthesizers to transform sounds: a 1967 concert in Berlin included a performance of John Cage's Solo for Voice 2 with Plantamura's voice transformed through a Moog synthesizer. At the end of the 1960s, they took part in the group Lo Zoo, founded by artist Michelangelo Pistoletto. They also used such "non-musical" objects as amplified panes of glass and olive oil cans.

Their performances achieved notoriety in Italy for their ability to generate riots.  

The final MEV tour was in 2017.

Discography
 Spacecraft, recorded in Cologne in 1967 by Bryant, Curran, Rzewski, Teitelbaum and Vandor
 Unified Patchwork Theory, recorded in Zurich in 1990 by Curran, Rzewski, Teitelbaum, Steve Lacy, and Garrett List
Both of the above first issued in 2001 on CD as "Spacecraft/Unified Patchwork Theory" (Alga Marghen, Plana-M 15NMN.038).
 Friday, recorded in London in 1969 by Curran, Rzewski, Teitelbaum, Franco Cataldi and Gunther Carius, reissued 2008 (ALGA 073CD)
 The Sound Pool, recorded 1969, reissued 1998 (Spalax CD14969)
 MEV 40, recorded 1967-2007, a 4-CD set of previously unpublished performances issued by New World Records in 2008 (CD80675)
 Apogee, a double CD (Matchless Recordings, MRCD61, 2005) shared with another of the electronic improvisational ensembles that emerged during the 1960s: AMM. The first CD is a studio recording in a joint session in England on April 30, 2004 featuring MEV's Curran, Teitelbaum and Rzewski with the three members of AMM. This is the first occasion that the two ensembles have performed together, but not the first time they have shared a split release - each outfit filled a side of the LP Live Electronic Music Improvised, released on a US label (Mainstream) in 1968. The second CD consists of the performances that each group gave at a festival held in London on May 1, 2004.

References

Further reading
Liner Notes, MEV 40
 Heißenbüttel, Dietrich. 2013. "Türen ins Offene: Das Labyrinth im musikalischen Denken von Schönberg, Berio und Rzewski". Neue Zeitschrift für Musik 174, no. 5 ("Labyrinth"): 26–29.

External links
Perfect Sound Forever: MEV

Musica Elettronica Viva site
Alvin Curran's web site — includes numerous MEV photos and several essays about the group
Friday, LP, 1969 — Friday Recording, out of print
Radio Eclectus #42: MEV live in Seattle — 2016 appearance in Seattle during MEV's final tour, broadcast by Radio Eclectus, KHUH-LP

Italian electronic music groups
Experimental musical groups
Musical groups established in 1966
Music in Rome
BYG Actuel artists
1966 establishments in Italy
Free improvisation ensembles